Anna Dadu Bansode is an Indian politician from Maharashtra. He has been a Member of Legislative Assembly of Maharashtra since 24 October 2019 from Pimpri. Previously he was elected by Pimpri in 2009.

References

External links 
 Anna Bansode result on ECI

1978 births
Living people
Members of the Maharashtra Legislative Assembly
Nationalist Congress Party politicians from Maharashtra
Savitribai Phule Pune University alumni